Passion (re-released as Passion: Music for The Last Temptation of Christ) is an album released in 1989 by the English singer-songwriter Peter Gabriel. It was the first Peter Gabriel album to be released on Real World Records. It is his second soundtrack and eighth album overall. It was originally composed as the soundtrack album for the film The Last Temptation of Christ, but Gabriel spent several months after the film's release further developing the music, finally releasing it as a full-fledged album instead of a movie soundtrack. It is seen as a landmark in the popularisation of world music, and won a Grammy Award for Best New Age Album in 1990. It was remastered with most of Gabriel's catalogue in 2002.

Overview
As the soundtrack for the film, Gabriel used the resources of WOMAD, an organization he founded, to bring together musicians from the Middle East, Africa, Europe and South Asia. He worked with them to create music meant to enhance the mood of the film, but he also added a modern ambient musical touch to the original pieces, producing a musical work that has influenced many musicians. Passion introduced many listeners to such artists as Nusrat Fateh Ali Khan, Youssou N'Dour, L. Shankar, and Baaba Maal.

Later in the year a companion album was released, Passion – Sources, featuring additional songs on which Gabriel does not perform. Gabriel described this album as "a selection of some of the traditional music, sources of inspiration, and location recordings."

The cover art for the album, Drawing study for Self Image II (1987), is a mixed media composition by the artist Julian Grater. When re-released, the album was titled Passion: Music for The Last Temptation of Christ due to "legal barriers" according to Gabriel in its liner notes.

Track listing

Personnel
 "The Feeling Begins"
 Manny Elias – octabans, surdo, skins
 Hossam Ramzy – finger cymbals, tabla, dufs
 Peter Gabriel – synthesizers, shakers, skins, surdo
 David Bottrill – drone mix
 David Rhodes – guitar
 L. Shankar – double violin
 Vatche Housepian – Armenian doudouk
 Antranik Askarian – Armenian doudouk
 The doudouk is playing an Armenian melody, "The Wind Subsides". (Armenian doudouks recorded for Ocora Records under the direction of Robert Ataian.)
 "Gethsemane"
 Peter Gabriel – flute samples, flute, voices
 "Of These, Hope"
 Massamba Diop – talking drum
 Peter Gabriel – bass, percussion, flute whistle, Prophet 5
 L. Shankar – double violin
 David Rhodes – guitar
 Mustafa Abdel Aziz – arghul drone
 "Lazarus Raised"
 (Players unknown) – Kurdish duduk & tanbur
 David Rhodes – guitars
 Peter Gabriel – piano, Akai S900
 This piece incorporates a traditional melody from Kurdistan telling of the unhappy love of a young girl for Bave Seyro, a legendary warrior. (Kurdish duduks are from UNESCO Collection – A Musical Anthology of the Orient, general editor Alain Danielou for Musicaphon Records.)
 "Of These, Hope – Reprise"
 Massamba Diop – talking drum
 Peter Gabriel – bass, percussion, flute whistle, Prophet 5
 L. Shankar – double violin
 David Rhodes – guitar
 Mustafa Abdel Aziz – arghul drone
 Baaba Maal – vocals
 Fatala – additional percussion
 "In Doubt"
 Peter Gabriel – Audioframe, Fairlight samples, vocals
 Mahmoud Tabrizi Zadeh – kementché
 "A Different Drum"
 Doudou N'Diaye Rose – percussion loop (four bars)
 Fatala – percussion loop (three bars)
 Peter Gabriel – surdo, percussion, Audioframe, Prophet 5, voice
 L. Shankar – double violin
 Youssou N'Dour – voice
 David Sancious – backing vocals
 "Zaar"
 Hossam Ramzy – tambourines, dufs, tabla, finger cymbals, triangle
 Peter Gabriel – surdo, additional percussion, Audioframe, Akai S900, voice
 Nathan East – bass
 David Rhodes – guitar
 Mahmoud Tabrizi Zadeh – kementché
 L. Shankar – double violin
 "Troubled"
 Bill Cobham – drums, percussion
 Hossam Ramzy – finger cymbals
 Peter Gabriel – percussion, Fairlight, Emulator, backing vocals
 David Sancious – backing vocals
 "Open"
 Peter Gabriel – Prophet 5, Akai S900, vocals
 L. Shankar – double violin, vocals
 "Before Night Falls"
 Hossam Ramzy – finger cymbals, tabla, dufs
 Kudsi Erguner – ney flute (playing a traditional Armenian melody)
 L. Shankar – double violin
 The Ney flute is playing a traditional Armenian melody.
 "With This Love"
 Robin Canter – oboe, cor Anglais
 L. Shankar – double violin
 David Sancious – Akai S900, synthesizer arrangement
 Peter Gabriel – Audioframe, Fairlight, piano, Prophet 5, synthesizer arrangement
 "Sandstorm"
 Location Recording – Moroccan percussion & vocals
 Hossam Ramzy – surdo, tabla, tambourine dufs, mazhar
 Manu Katché – additional percussion
 Mahmoud Tabrizi Zadeh – kementché
 L. Shankar – double violin
 Peter Gabriel – Fairlight
 "Stigmata"
 Mahmoud Tabrizi Zadeh – kementché
 Peter Gabriel – Prophet 5, voice
 Based on an improvisation by Mahmoud and Peter Gabriel
 "Passion"
 Djalma Correa – Brazilian percussion
 Jon Hassell – trumpet
 Peter Gabriel – Prophet 5, Akai S900, Fairlight, voice
 Nusrat Fateh Ali Khan – Qawwali voice
 L. Shankar – double violin
 Youssou N'Dour – voice
 Julian Wilkins – choirboy
 "With This Love (Choir)"
 Robin Canter – cor anglais
 Richard Evans – choir recording
 "Wall of Breath"
 Kudsi Erguner – Turkish ney flute
 L. Shankar – double violin
 Musicians Du Nil – arghul
 David Rhodes – Ebow guitar
 Peter Gabriel – synthesizers
 "The Promise of Shadows"
 Bill Cobham – drum kit
 David Bottrill – lead tambourine
 Peter Gabriel – Emulator, Prophet 5, Audioframe, additional percussion
 David Rhodes – guitar
 "Disturbed"
 Hossam Ramzy – surdo, tabla
 Mustafa Abdel Aziz – percussion loop
 Said Mohammad Aly – percussion loop
 Fatala – African percussion
 L. Shankar – double violin
 Peter Gabriel – Fairlight, Prophet 5
 "It Is Accomplished"
 Bill Cobham – drums, tambourine
 David Bottrill – tambourine 2, distorted slide
 Nathan East – bass
 Mustafa Abdel Aziz – arghul drone
 David Sancious – Hammond organ
 David Rhodes – Steinberger guitar
 Peter Gabriel – doholla, additional percussion, Roland D-50, piano, Prophet 5, voice
 "Bread and Wine"
 Peter Gabriel – contrabass, Prophet 5, voice
 David Rhodes – EBow guitar
 Richard Evans – tin whistle
 L. Shankar – double violin

Charts

Certifications

Notes

External links

Peter Gabriel soundtracks
Albums produced by Peter Gabriel
1989 soundtrack albums
Instrumental soundtracks
Geffen Records soundtracks
Grammy Award for Best New Age Album
Virgin Records soundtracks
Real World Records albums
Drama film soundtracks